Dr. James H. Ammons is an American educator, who is the Chancellor of Southern University at New Orleans. He served as president of Florida A&M University (FAMU) from July 2, 2007, until his resignation took effect on July 16, 2012. He is a native Floridian who grew up in the heart of Florida's citrus belt.  He graduated from Winter Haven High School in 1970 and entered Florida A&M University on the Thirteen College Curriculum Program during the fall semester of 1970. Dr. Ammons was appointed Chancellor at Southern University at New Orleans January 8, 2021.

Education
In 1974, he graduated cum laude with a B.S. degree in Political Science. After being awarded the Minority Graduate Fellowship from the American Political Science Association, he earned a M.S. in Public Administration in 1975, and a Ph.D. in government in 1977, both from Florida State University.

Early career
Ammons began his teaching career in public policy and administration in 1977 as an assistant professor at the University of Central Florida. He returned to FAMU in 1983 as an associate professor of political science, and in 1984, he was promoted to the position of assistant vice president for academic affairs. In 1989, he was promoted to associate vice president for academic affairs and also served as director of Title III Programs. He was promoted to the rank of a full professor in 1993, and FAMU President Frederick S. Humphries appointed him to the position of provost and vice president for academic affairs on October 1, 1995.  At Florida A&M University, he developed more than 22 bachelor's, master's and Ph.D. degree programs; and worked to reestablish the FAMU School of Law.

North Carolina Central University
Ammons became the ninth chancellor of North Carolina Central University (NCCU) on June 1, 2001.

At NCCU, enrollment reached an all-time high during his tenure, climbing from 5,473 in fall 2001 to 8,675 in fall 2006- a 58.4 percent increase. NCCU became the fastest growing institution in the University of North Carolina System at that time.

Since his tenure, NCCU attracted its first National Achievement Scholars with three finalists and three semifinalists in its fall 2002 freshman class.  Chancellor Ammons also managed the $121 million 2000 Bond Program, which includes a  $36 million science complex. A new Biomanufacturing Research Institute and Technology Enterprise was also built on the campus.  This institute produces bachelor's, master's and Ph.D.'s degree holders for the biomanufacturing industry. He worked to expand program offerings by planning Ph.D. programs in communications disorders, information sciences, bioprocessing and biomedical sciences.   Currently, NCCU offers academic programs in the Schools of Law, Education, Library and Information Sciences, Business; and the College of Arts and Sciences.

Florida A&M University
On July 2, 2007, Dr. James H. Ammons became the tenth president of Florida A&M University. Ammons's contract included the provision that it renewed on a daily basis (essentially making him "president for life"), and guaranteed an annual "performance bonus" of 25 to 35 percent of his $325,000 base salary. According to the Chronicle of Higher Education, Ammons was the only university president in Florida to have such an "evergreen" contract.

On July 11, 2012, Ammons announced that he would resign on October 11, 2012; this came several months after university Marching "100" Drum Major Robert Champon died following a hazing incident. However, on July 16, 2012, members of the Florida A&M University board of trustees voted to make his resignation effective immediately. Dr. Larry Robinson was to serve as interim president. Ammons remained at Florida A&M as a tenured professor on the faculty.

Additional experience

Ammons currently serves as a member of the Central Carolina Bank Durham Advisory Board and as a member of the board of directors of the Greater Durham Chamber of Commerce and Leadership North Carolina. In September 2002, he was elected to serve as a member of the board of directors for the National Association for Equal Opportunity in Higher Education.  He also served as a member of the Joint Commission on Accountability Reporting of the American Association of State Colleges and Universities and the National Association of State Universities and Land Grant Colleges. In December 2003, he was appointed to the advisory committee for Habitat for Humanity of Durham.

Ammons has received many honors and awards, and is actively involved in the community. In November 2002, he received the "Citizen of the Year Award" from the Beta Phi chapter of Omega Psi Phi fraternity. He was selected in 2001 as the honorary chair of Light Up Durham, a community holiday festival, and honorary co-chair of the Durham Public Education Network. The News & Observer named Ammons one of the "10 to Watch in 2002." He was honored in August 2002 as one of the first recipients of the "Guardian of Our Legacy Award" presented during the Harlem Week National Historic Black College Fair Reception and Reunion in New York. He received the award for serving as an "outstanding role model and leader" in higher education.

He was an American Council on Education Fellow, and in 1987–88, he served as political science faculty program consultant for the Florida Board of Regents; and Alpha Kappa Mu Scholar, 1970–74. He received the Distinguished Alumni Award by the College of Arts and Sciences of Florida A&M University, 1987; in 1995, he was given the Distinguished Alumni Award by the Florida State University College of Social Sciences; in 1999, he received the Distinguished Alumni Award from Florida A&M University and in 2000, was the recipient of the Millennium Award by Florida A&M University.

He is married to the former Judy (Ruffin) and they have one son, James, III.

References

Presidents of Florida A&M University
University of Central Florida faculty
Florida A&M University alumni
Askew School of Public Administration and Policy alumni
Chancellors of North Carolina Central University
Living people
1953 births